Scrambler (Kim Il Sung) is a fictional mutant character appearing in American comic books published by Marvel Comics.

Publication history

He first appeared in The Uncanny X-Men #210 and was created by Chris Claremont, John Romita Jr. and Dan Green.

Fictional character biography
Scrambler is a mutant and a sociopath, and a member of the Marauders, a band of assassins who were gathered together by the mutant thief Gambit at the request of the enigmatic mastermind known as Mister Sinister.

Sinister first sent the Marauders to murder the entire population of the underground mutant community known as the Morlocks. In the course of this mutant massacre, the Marauders clashed with the mutant adventurers known as the X-Men and the original X-Factor team. Subsequently, the X-Men thwarted the Marauders' attempt to assassinate Sinister's former pawn, Madelyne Pryor, in San Francisco.

Later, Sinister sent the Marauders to battle the X-Men during the time of the demonic invasion of New York City known as the "Inferno".  The Marauders were all killed during the "Inferno", but Sinister possesses the ability to clone them thanks to samples of their DNA. The Marauders later clashed with the dimensionally-displaced young mutant known as Nate Grey after they attempted to assassinate Sinister's former servant, Threnody.

Endangered Species/Messiah Complex
Scrambler later returns alongside the reorganized Marauders.

During the final battle for the mutant baby, the first birth since Decimation, Scrambler goes over to Wolverine and shuts off his healing factor so that he won't heal from the bullet, after being shot in the eye by Scalphunter. However, X-23 appears and literally dismantles Scrambler, cutting off both his hands and eviscerating him.

Recovery/Reformation
The Deadpool V Gambit miniseries reveals that Scrambler was found by paramedics, who saved his life. At the suggestion of Jennifer Walters, Kim agrees to testify against Scalphunter in exchange for being placed on parole. Giving up his supervillain life, Kim gets a pair of prosthetic hands (which he can use his powers to manipulate), takes a job at an auto garage, and falls in love.

After being attacked by a vengeful Scalphunter, Kim is embroiled in one of Loki's schemes, and set against Deadpool and Gambit, scrambling both their power sets. The mercenary duo manage to regain control over their abilities after Gambit charges Deadpool and throws him at Kim. Kim survives the experience, and once more swears off villainy, using the land meant for the defeated Loki to make a new home for himself, his girlfriend, and her daughter.

Powers and abilities
Scrambler is a mutant who possesses the ability to disrupt any system with his touch. His touch disrupts systems, whether they be a living being, a machine, or a field of energy. Scrambler must physically touch his target in order to affect it. Scrambler can control the effect  so that, in the case of a nervous system, he can cause immobilization, unconsciousness, or seizures. If his victim is a metahuman who possesses powers, Scrambler can cancel or disrupt the function of those powers, often causing them to go into overdrive, in which they flare up and then burn out for a certain period of time.

References

Characters created by Chris Claremont
Characters created by John Romita Jr.
Clone characters in comics
Comics characters introduced in 1986
Fictional Korean people
Fictional mercenaries in comics
Fictional murderers
Marvel Comics mutants
Marvel Comics supervillains